The Melanosclerites are a group of problematic microfossils obtained by palynological processing.

Morphology
The form-taxon contains a wide array of rod-like fossils, 100 µm to some mm long, that culminate in a broad bulbous 'head', often separated from the stalk by a constriction.  The bulbous end may bear broad 'prongs', giving the appearance of the end of a human femur where the prongs are paired, although the prongs often occur in higher number – five, six, a dozen – with some resemblance to Namacalathus.

Affinity
Affinity of Melanosclerites is uncertain; algal has been proposed, but hydrozoan (cnidarian)is preferred, but not conclusively established.
Melanoscleritoites Eisenack, 1963 is interpreted as a hydrozoan, with other taxa not attributable to that particular class, on the basis of a broad morphological similarity – though the distinguishing features are far from unequivocal, and the preservation of the material raises some taphonomic problems.  The composition resembles that of chitinozoans, scolecodonts, graptolites, and fungi – though a particular species of extant cubomedusan hydroid does produce a similarity resilient "chitinous" 'wall'.

Occurrence 
They have been reported in shallow marine sandstones and limestones, as well as upper slope and open marine sediments, in strata from the Lower Cambrian to Upper Devonian.

Taxa include:
 Eichbaumia Schallreuter, 1981
 Eichbaumia incus Schallreuter, 1981
 Melanoarbustum Górka, 1971
 Melanoarbustum balticum Górka, 1971
 Melanoclava Eisenack, 1942
 Melanoclava betaotda Eisenack, 1942
 Melanocyathus Eisenack, 1942
 Melanocyathus dentatus Eisenack, 1942
 Melanoporella Górka, 1971
 Melanoporella polonica Górka, 1971
 Melanoporella bulla
 Melanoporella clava Schallreuter, 1981
 Melanorhachis Eisenack, 1942
 Melanorhachis regularis Eisenack, 1942
 Melanoscleritoites Eisenack, 1963
 Melanosteus Eisenack, 1942
 Melanosteus acutus Eisenack, 1942
 Melanostylus Eisenack, 1963
 Melanostylus coronifer Eisenack, 1963
 Menola Schallreuter, 1981
 Menola os Schallreuter, 1981
 Mirachitina Eisenack, 1963
 Mirachitina quadrupedis Eisenack, 1963
 Semenola Schallreuter, 1981
 Semenola semen Schallreuter, 1981

References

Incertae sedis
Ordovician fossil record